Prospect Grove is an unincorporated community in Scotland County, in the U.S. state of Missouri.

History
A post office called Prospect Grove was established in 1850, and remained in operation until 1907. The community was named for the prairie near the original town site.

References

Unincorporated communities in Scotland County, Missouri
Unincorporated communities in Missouri